Hendrik Theodorus Petrus "Dirk-Jan" van Gendt (born July 18, 1974) is a retired volleyball player from the Netherlands and was part of the Netherlands men's national volleyball team. He represented his native country at the 2004 Summer Olympics in Athens, Greece. There he ended up in ninth place with the Dutch Men's National Team. He also competed at the 2001 Men's European Volleyball Championship, 2002 FIVB Volleyball Men's World Championship in Argentina, 2007 Men's European Volleyball Championship and 2013 FIVB Volleyball World League. He played for the Moerser Sportclub (Germany).

He was born in Boxtel, North Brabant.

Clubs
  Alcom/Capelle (2002)
  Moerser Sportclub

References

  Dutch Olympic Committee

1974 births
Living people
Dutch men's volleyball players
Olympic volleyball players of the Netherlands
People from Boxtel
Sportspeople from North Brabant
Volleyball players at the 2004 Summer Olympics